Weishan County is a county of southwestern Shandong province, People's Republic of China, bordering Jiangsu province to the south. It is under the administration of Jining City, and much of its area is occupied by Nansi, or Weishan Lake.

Administrative divisions
As 2012, this county is divided to 2 subdistricts, 6 towns and 7 townships.
Subdistricts
Xiazhen Subdistrict
Zhaoyang Subdistrict

Towns

Townships

Climate

References

External links 
 Official homepage

Counties of Shandong
Jining